Robert Downie is a British lightweight rower. He won a gold medal at the 1978 FISA Lightweight Championships in Copenhagen with the lightweight men's eight.

References

British male rowers
World Rowing Championships medalists for Great Britain
Possibly living people
Year of birth missing